Kseniya Lvovna Ryabinkina is a Russian professional ballet dancer and character actor. She has appeared in Soviet, Russian and Hindi cinema since the 1960s.

Early life
Kseniya Ryabinkina was born in Moscow to a ballerina mother and a geo-physics doctor. She has an elder sister by four years by name of Elena, also an accomplished ballerina.

Career
She started her career as a ballerina in Moscow’s Bolshoi Theatre.

She is best remembered in India as Marina, the Russian circus trapeze artiste cum love interest from Raj Kapoor's classic 1970 film Mera Naam Joker.

Later years
In 2009, the Russian actress made her return to Bollywood. Ryabinkina acted in Chintuji, a film that was loosely based on incidents from Raj Kapoor's son – Rishi Kapoor's life. She still mentors ballerinas and actors in Russia.

Filmography

References

External links

Living people
Actresses from Moscow
Soviet film actresses
Soviet stage actresses
Russian film actresses
Russian stage actresses
Soviet ballerinas
Russian ballerinas
Bolshoi Theatre
Soviet expatriates in India
Russian expatriates in India
Actresses in Hindi cinema
European actresses in India
Actresses of European descent in Indian films
20th-century Russian ballet dancers
20th-century Russian actresses
21st-century Russian actresses
Year of birth missing (living people)